Zhou Yaning (born December 1957) is a general (shang jiang) of the People's Liberation Army (PLA) of China. He served as commander of the PLA Rocket Force from 2017 to 2022.

Biography 
Zhou Yaning was born in Nangong, Hebei. He joined the People's Liberation Army in December 1976, at the age of 19. Zhou rose through the ranks of the Second Artillery Corps. In January 2015, he was appointed deputy commander of the PLA Second Artillery Force (later renamed as PLA Rocket Force). Zhou replaced Wei Fenghe as commander of the PLA Rocket Force in September 2017, and was promoted to the rank of lieutenant general in August 2016. Zhou also served as 52nd Base Commander, 53rd Base Commander, and a variety of other command positions in the Second Artillery.

In October 2017, Zhou was elected a member of the 19th Central Committee of the Chinese Communist Party.

References

Living people
1957 births
Members of the 19th Central Committee of the Chinese Communist Party
People's Liberation Army generals from Hebei
People from Xingtai